The National Union of Hosiery and Knitwear Workers (NUHKW) was a trade union in the United Kingdom.

History

The union was founded in 1945, with the merger of five local unions: the Hinckley and District Hosiery Union, Ilkeston and District Hosiery Union, Leicester and Leicestershire Amalgamated Hosiery Union, Loughborough Federated Hosiery Union and Nottingham and District Hosiery Workers' Society.  Shortly after, most Scottish unions voted to join the new organisation. Sections were also created for northern and southern England and, by the end of the year, it had 22,430 members.  The following year, it secured a national agreement limiting night work and restricting total working to 45 hours per week.

In 1970, a threat of national strike action secured a 10% wage increase and the abandonment of plans for a continuous shift system.  Membership of the union continued to grow, reaching a peak of 74,077 in 1977.

In 1969, the Nottingham Hosiery Finishers' Association amalgamated with the union, becoming its Nottingham (Finishers) District.  This was followed by the Leicester and Leicestershire Trimmers' and Auxiliary Association in 1970, and then all the other minor unions in the industry.  The long-established Amalgamated Society of Operative Lace Makers and Textile Workers also joined.  However, widespread redundancies in the sector began reducing membership.  In 1991, it merged with the National Union of Footwear, Leather and Allied Trades, with 34,183 members remaining to join the new National Union of Knitwear, Footwear and Apparel Trades.

Leadership

General Presidents
1945: Horace Moulden
1963: George Dearing
1968: Peter Pendergast
1975: Harold Gibson
1982: David Lambert

General Secretaries
1945: Clifford Groocock
1960: George Dearing
1963: Harold Gibson
1975: David Lambert
1982: George Marshall
1984: Tom Kirk
1989: Helen McGrath

Further reading
 Richard Gurnham A History of the TRADE UNION MOVEMENT in the HOSIERY and KNITWEAR INDUSTRY 1776-1976 (NUHKW, Leicester 1976)
 Bramwell G Rudd COURTAULDS and the HOSIERY & KNITWEAR INDUSTRY (Carnegie Publishing Ltd) (2014, ISBN softback 978-1-905472-06-2, hardback 978-1-905472-18-5)

References

External links
Catalogue of the NUHKW archives, held at the Modern Records Centre, University of Warwick

Defunct trade unions of the United Kingdom
Trade unions established in 1945
Trade unions disestablished in 1991
Textile and clothing trade unions
1945 establishments in the United Kingdom
Trade unions based in Leicestershire